The QR family of inline-four piston engines by Nissan were introduced in 2000 and range from  in displacement. These motors are aluminum, dual overhead camshaft (DOHC), four-valve designs with variable valve timing and optional direct injection. The engine shares much of its architecture with the YD diesel engine.

QR20DE

The QR20DE was replaced with the MR20DE engine in most applications in early 2005.

Vehicle applications:
 2001-2007 Nissan X-Trail T30, 
 2001-2007 Nissan Primera  P12
 2002–present Nissan Serena C24, 
 2003-2008 Nissan Teana J31, 
 2001-2005 Nissan Wingroad Y11
 2002-2005 Nissan Avenir W11
 2001-2004 Nissan Prairie M12
 2007-2020 Nissan Atlas F24

QR20DD

The QR20DD is similar to the QR20DE but features NEO direct injection to improve fuel economy and to reduce emissions.

Vehicle applications:
 2000-2004 Nissan Bluebird Sylphy

QR25DE

The QR25DE is a  variant built with cast steel connecting rods, a steel timing chain, counter-rotating balance shafts, and an aluminum intake manifold.

2007+ QR25DE
The revised QR25DE found in the 2007+ Sentra, Altima, Rogue, etc. has a number of improvements over the older QR25DE. These include:
 A simpler, larger diameter single path resin intake manifold replaced the old dual path design. (Note: California emissions models do have a swirl control valve located in the intake)
 Revised piston crown shape to support a higher compression ratio of 9.6:1.(10.5:1 in Sentra SE-R Spec V.)
 The balancer system has been moved back slightly from the crank pulley to a more centric location in the block.
 Revised cam shaft profile.
 Reinforced connecting rods only available in the Sentra SE-R Spec V 2007-2012 .
 Reduced friction likely through Nissan's extensive use of coatings on pistons, journal bearings, etc.
 Additional engine mount on the top of the motor, pulley side.
 Higher rev limit and improved power output.

 1999–2003 Nissan Bassara- 
 2001–2005 Nissan Serena C24- 
 2001–2007 Nissan X-Trail T30 APEC export version- 
 2002–2006 Nissan Sentra SE-R-  & SE-R Spec V- 
 2002–2009 Nissan Presage- 
 2002–2020 Nissan Altima  to 
 2003–2005 Nissan Teana- 
 2003–present Nissan Murano (Japan)
 2005–2021 Nissan Frontier- 
 2007–2012 Nissan Sentra SE-R-  & SE-R Spec V- 
 2007–2011 Nissan Altima Hybrid , combined 
 2007–present Nissan X-Trail T31- 
 2007–present Renault Koleos TR25- 
 2008–2020 Nissan Rogue- 
 2009–2012 Suzuki Equator- 
 2013–present Nissan Teana- 
 2013–present Nissan X-Trail T32- 
 2010–present Nissan Elgrand E52
 2018–present Nissan Terra- 
 2020–present Nissan X-Terra-

QR25DD

The QR25DD is similar to the QR25DE but increases the compression ratio to 10.5:1 and includes direct injection. This engine is also the first QR to use DLC coating on the valve lifter buckets for reduced friction.

Vehicle applications:
 2002-2006 Nissan Primera P12 (JDM)

QR25DER
The QR25DER is similar to the QR25DE but has a supercharger for increased power and is coupled with a  electric motor, Dual Clutch System, and lithium-ion battery for increased fuel efficiency.

Vehicle applications:
 2014 - 2015 Nissan Pathfinder Hybrid
 2016 only Nissan Murano Hybrid
 2014 - 2017 Infiniti QX60 Hybrid

See also
 List of Nissan engines

References

General references
 "2007 Nissan Altima overview"
 "2007 Nissan Altima specifications"
 "2006 Nissan Altima specifications"
 "2006 Nissan Frontier specifications
 "2006 Nissan Sentra specifications"
 "NTB03070 Nissan technical service bulletin regarding engine precatalyst failure"
 "NTB06045 Nissan technical service bulletin regarding low oil levels"
 "NTB05058 Nissan technical service bulletin regarding power valve screws"
 "Road Test: 2002 Nissan Sentra SE-R" by Josh Jacquot, "SportCompactCar", December 2001, retrieved June 26, 2006
 "Technobabble: December 2001 by Dave Coleman, "SportCompactCar", December 2001, retrieved June 26, 2006
2014 Infiniti QX70 QR25DER Compression Ratio. Infiniti QX70 Electronic Service Manual, p. EM-154 (2014)

External links
 "B15U.com - A Nissan Sentra Forum"
 "B15sentra.net - Another Nissan Forum for both B15 and B16 Sentras."
 "AllSentra.com - A Forum for all Sentras"

QR
Straight-four engines
Gasoline engines by model